"Frankie" is a song by American vocal group Sister Sledge, released as a single in 1985. It is taken from their eighth studio album, When the Boys Meet the Girls (1985).

Overview
The song was written by Denise Rich (under the pseudonym "Joy Denny") after dreaming while on a flight from the United States to Switzerland. According to the Now 5 album (on which the song appears) the song was written about Frank Sinatra.

The song was produced by Chic's Nile Rodgers, who had co-produced the sisters' earlier hits such as "He's the Greatest Dancer" and "We Are Family". The sisters suggested the song to him, but he hated it on first hearing. A week later, he went back to them saying he could not stop singing it and so he insisted that the band recorded it.

A marked contrast to the disco cuts which had made them internationally famous in the late 1970s, this girl-pop number became a hit in the UK Singles Chart, spending four weeks at number one in June and July 1985. It fared much less well in the US where it peaked at number 75 on the Billboard Hot 100, No. 32 R&B and No. 15 Adult Contemporary.

"Frankie" was fifth best selling single of 1985 with 698,000 sold copies in United Kingdom.

Charts

Weekly charts

Year-end charts

Certifications

References

1985 singles
1985 songs
Irish Singles Chart number-one singles
Sister Sledge songs
Song recordings produced by Nile Rodgers
Songs written by Denise Eisenberg Rich
UK Singles Chart number-one singles